Svetlana Krivencheva is a retired tennis player from Bulgaria.

Krivencheva won two singles and 21 doubles titles on the ITF Women's Circuit in her career. On 9 February 1998, she reached her best singles ranking of 142nd in the world. On 3 August 1998, she peaked at No. 63 in doubles rankings.

Krivencheva retired from professional tennis in 2012, but made a temporary return at the 2017 Central Coast Open in Templeton, California.

ITF Circuit finals

Singles: 9 (2 titles, 7 runner–ups)

Doubles: 41 (21 titles, 20 runner–ups)

References

External links
 
 
 

Bulgarian female tennis players
1973 births
Sportspeople from Plovdiv
Living people
21st-century Bulgarian women